McNerney is a surname. Notable people with the surname include:

David H. McNerney (1931-2010), American soldier and Medal of Honor recipient
Dennis McNerney, American politician
James McNerney (born 1949), American business executive
Jerry McNerney (born 1951), American politician